Dorothy Green may refer to:
Dorothy Green (actress) (1920–2008), American actress
Dorothy Green (environmentalist) (1929–2008), conservationist and environmentalist
Dorothy Green (silent film actress) (1886-1963), American silent film actress
Dorothy Green (tennis) (1897-1964), American tennis player at the start of the 20th century
Dolly Green (Dorothy Wellborn Green, 1906–1990), American heiress, philanthropist and thoroughbred owner
Dorothy Auchterlonie (1915–1991), also known as Dorothy Green, Australian author and critic
Dottie Green (1921–1992), professional baseball player